Sullivan Field may refer to:

 Sullivan Field (University of Incarnate Word), the baseball field of the Incarnate Word Cardinals
 Sullivan Field (Loyola Marymount), the soccer/futbol field of the Loyola Marymount Lions